The Decision Linear (DLIN) assumption is a computational hardness assumption used in elliptic curve cryptography. In particular, the DLIN assumption is useful in settings where the decisional Diffie–Hellman assumption does not hold (as is often the case in pairing-based cryptography). The Decision Linear assumption was introduced by Boneh, Boyen, and Shacham.

Informally the DLIN assumption states that given , with  random group elements and  random exponents, it is hard to distinguish  from an independent random group element .

Motivation
In symmetric pairing-based cryptography the group  is equipped with a pairing  which is bilinear. This map gives an efficient algorithm to solve the decisional Diffie-Hellman problem. This follows by using the pairing: note that

Thus, if , then the values  and  will be equal.

Since this cryptographic assumption, essential to building ElGamal encryption and signatures, does not hold in this case, new assumptions are needed to build cryptography in symmetric bilinear groups. The DLIN assumption is a modification of Diffie-Hellman type assumptions to thwart the above attack.

Formal definition
Let  be a cyclic group of prime order . Define a distribution

Define another distribution

Applications

Linear encryption
Boneh, Boyen, and Shacham define a public key encryption scheme by analogy to ElGamal encryption. In this scheme, a public key is the generators . The private key is two exponents such that . Encryption combines a message  with the public key to create a ciphertext
.
To decrypt the ciphertext, the private key can be used to compute

To check that this encryption scheme is correct, i.e.  when both parties follow the protocol, note that

Then using the fact that  yields

Further, this scheme is IND-CPA secure assuming that the DLIN assumption holds.

Short group signatures
Boneh, Boyen, and Shacham also use DLIN in a scheme for group signatures.  The signatures are called "short group signatures" because, with a standard security level, they can be represented in only 250 bytes.

Their protocol first uses linear encryption in order to define a special type of zero-knowledge proof. Then the Fiat–Shamir heuristic is applied to transform the proof system into a digital signature. They prove this signature fulfills the additional requirements of unforgeability, anonymity, and traceability required of a group signature.

Their proof relies on not only the DLIN assumption but also another assumption called the -strong Diffie-Hellman assumption. It is proven in the random oracle model.

Other applications
Since its definition in 2004, the Decision Linear assumption has seen a variety of other applications. These include the construction of a pseudorandom function that generalizes the Naor-Reingold construction,  an attribute-based encryption scheme,  and a special class of non-interactive zero-knowledge proofs.

References

Computational hardness assumptions
Elliptic curve cryptography
Pairing-based cryptography